Violations of Communist Party political discipline in China refers to acts by members of the Chinese Communist Party that are believed to have violated the Party's regulations on conduct of its members. The CPC maintains a variety of sanctions for punishing disciplinary violations, the most well-known of which is the Shuanggui ("double restraint" or "double designation") procedure.

Suspected disciplinary violations are investigated in China by the Central Commission for Discipline Inspection, a Party agency that reports to the Central Committee on its work. After the CCDI has concluded its investigation on a case, the matter is often only then handed to the judiciary.

The disciplinary codes and sanctions that Party members are subject to are set forth in the Constitution of the Communist Party; they govern issues like ethical conduct, embezzlement, and adherence to the Party line. Administrative warnings can be issued, followed by demerits, demotions, dismissals, or worse.

References 

Chinese Communist Party